The United States competed at the 2020 Summer Paralympics in Tokyo, Japan from 24 August to 5 September 2021.

Medalists

Archery

Eric Bennett, Lia Coryell, Kevin Mather, KJ Polish, Emma Rose Ravish, Andre Shelby and Matt Stutzman have all qualified.

Men

Women

Mixed

Athletics

35 male athletes and 26 female athletes have been selected to compete.
Men's track

Women's track

Mixed track

Men's field

Women's field

Cycling

Joseph Berenyi, Clara Brown, Alicia Dana, Thomas Davis, Alfredo de los Santos, Will Groulx, Cody Jung, Oksana Masters, Shawn Morelli, Christopher Murphy, Eric Pinney, Matthew Rodriguez, Monica Sereda, Jill Walsh and Jamie Whitmore have all qualified to compete.

Equestrian

Rebecca Hart, Beatrice Lasnier De Lavalette, Kate Shoemaker and Roxanne Trunnell have all qualified to compete.

Goalball

Men

Group stage

Quarter-final

Semi-finals

Bronze medal match

Women

Group stage

Quarter-final

Semi-finals

Gold medal match

Judo

Katie Davis, Ben Goodrich, Maria Liana Mutia and Robert Tanaka have all qualified to compete.

Paracanoeing

Kaitlyn Verfuerth and Blake Haxton have both qualified to compete. Haxton is also going to compete in rowing.

Paratriathlon

Seven paratriathletes have qualified to compete.

Powerlifting

Jacob Schrom has qualified to compete.

Rowing

U.S. qualified four boats for all of the rowing classes into the Paralympic regatta. All of them qualified after successfully entering the top seven for single sculls events and top eight for mixed events at the 2019 World Rowing Championships in Ottensheim, Austria.

Qualification Legend: FA=Final A (medal); FB=Final B (non-medal); R=Repechage

Shooting

Jazmin-Almlie-Ryan, Stetson Bardfield, Taylor Farmer, McKenna Geer, Yan Xiao Gong, John Joss and Kevin Nguyen have all qualified to compete.

Sitting volleyball

The women's sitting volleyball team qualified for the 2020 Summer Paralympics after their results at the 2018 World ParaVolley Championships.

Summary

Women's tournament 

Group play

Semifinal

Gold medal game

Swimming

34 American swimmers are qualified to compete in the Paralympics.
Men

Women

Table tennis

United States entered three athletes into the table tennis competition at the games. Ian Seidenfeld & Tahl Leibovitz qualified from 2019 Parapan American Games which was held in Lima, Peru and Jenson Van Emburgh via World Ranking allocation.

Men

Taekwondo

Para taekwondo makes its debut appearance in the Paralympic programme, Evan Medell & Brianna Salinaro, qualified to the 2020 Summer Paralympics via World Ranking.

Wheelchair basketball

Men's tournament

Roster

Groupstage

Quarter-final

Semi-finals

Women's tournament

Roster

Groupstage

Quarterfinal

Semifinal

Bronze medal match

Wheelchair fencing

Ellen Geddes, Terry Hayes and Shelby Jensen have all qualified to compete.

Wheelchair rugby

United States national wheelchair rugby team qualified for the Games for the games by winning the gold medal at the 2019 Parapan American Games in Lima, Peru.

Team roster
 Team event – 1 team of 12 players

Group stage

Semifinal

Gold medal match

Wheelchair tennis

U.S. qualified seven players entries for wheelchair tennis. Five of them qualified by world ranking, while the other qualified by received the bipartite commission invitation allocation quotas.

See also
United States at the Paralympics
United States at the 2020 Summer Olympics

References

Nations at the 2020 Summer Paralympics
2020
2021 in American sports